Charles Edward Sayle (6 December 1864 – 4 July 1924) was an English Uranian poet, literary scholar and librarian. He was the youngest son of Robert Sayle, a wealthy salesman, and Priscilla Caroline Sayle. He served as an under-librarian at Cambridge University Library. His works include Bertha: a story of love (1885), Wicliff: an historical drama (1887), Erotidia (1889), Musa Consolatrix (1893), Private Music (1911) and Cambridge Fragments (1913). He also edited an anthology of verse, In Praise of Music (1897) and compiled Annals of Cambridge University Library; 1278-1900 (1916). He edited the 3-volume Works of Sir Thomas Browne; volumes I & II were published in 1904 by Grant Richards in London; volume III was published in 1907 by John Grant in Edinburgh.

Charles Sayle's salon, a circle of bright, handsome and predominantly homosexual young men who congregated at his house in Cambridge, included Rupert Brooke, George Mallory, Augustus Bartholomew and Geoffrey Keynes.

Sayle's publisher was Bernard Quaritch, a bookseller who specialised in unpopular but praiseworthy scholastic publications.

Notes

External links

 
 
Sayle's 1893 volume of poems, Musa Consolatrix, downloadable at Google Books

British gay writers
1864 births
1924 deaths
English librarians
English LGBT poets
English male poets